Brian Tyree Henry (born March 31, 1982) is an American actor. He rose to prominence for his role as Alfred "Paper Boi" Miles in the FX comedy-drama series Atlanta (2016–2022), for which he received a nomination for the Primetime Emmy Award for Outstanding Supporting Actor in a Comedy Series. Throughout his career, Henry has received nominations for an Academy Award, two Primetime Emmy Awards, a Screen Actors Guild Award, and a Tony Award.

On television, he is known for his performances in Boardwalk Empire, This Is Us and How to Get Away with Murder. Henry made his film breakthrough in 2018 with starring roles in Steve McQueen's heist film Widows, Barry Jenkins' romantic drama film If Beale Street Could Talk, and the animated superhero film Spider-Man: Into the Spider-Verse. He's since appeared in Child's Play (2019), Godzilla vs. Kong (2021), The Woman in the Window (2021), and Bullet Train (2022). He portrayed Phastos in the Marvel Cinematic Universe film Eternals (2021). In 2022, he starred in Causeway, which earned him a nomination for the Academy Award for Best Supporting Actor.

He has also appeared on stage, making his debut performance in the Shakespeare in the Park production of Romeo and Juliet (2007), and acting in various plays at the Public Theatre, before appearing in the original Broadway cast of The Book of Mormon (2011).  In 2014 he appeared in the off-Broadway musical The Fortress of Solitude. For his performance in the 2018 Broadway revival of Kenneth Lonergan's play Lobby Hero, he received a nomination for the Tony Award for Best Featured Actor in a Play.

Early life
Henry was born in Fayetteville, North Carolina and raised partly in Washington, D.C. His father was in the military, and his mother, Willow Dean Kearse, was an educator. Henry attended Morehouse College in Atlanta, Georgia as a business major-turned-actor in the early 2000s, and received his master's degree from Yale School of Drama .

Career

2007–2015: Early career
Henry began his career on stage, with roles in numerous plays and musicals. In 2007, he starred as Tybalt in Shakespeare in the Park's production of Romeo and Juliet. Henry also appeared in Tarell Alvin McCraney's trilogy of plays, titled The Brother/Sister Plays. In 2011, he received further success in his Broadway debut as a part of the original cast of the musical The Book of Mormon opposite Josh Gad and Andrew Rannells.

Henry made guest appearances in television series such as NBC's Law & Order, and CBS's The Good Wife. In 2013 he had a brief but recurring role as Winston Scrapper in HBO's Boardwalk Empire appearing in the episodes "Havre de Grace" and "Farewell Daddy Blues". The following year he appeared in Steven Soderbergh's Cinemax series The Knick as Larkin in the episode "The Busy Flea". He made his feature film debut in the 2015 comedy film Puerto Ricans in Paris.

2016–present: Breakthrough
In 2016, Henry received critical acclaim and recognition for his starring role as Alfred "Paper Boi" Miles in the FX comedy-drama series Atlanta. For his performance in the series, he received a nomination for the Primetime Emmy Award for Outstanding Supporting Actor in a Comedy Series for his performance in the episode "Woods". Chase Hutchinson of Collider declared Henry the "show's best character" writing, "Uniting [Atlanta] is the irreplaceable Henry’s sense of presence and vulnerability he conveys as an actor, an element of the show that would not be the same without him. It makes him one of the best parts of the series and one of the best actors working today for all he manages to do in even the simplest of moments."

From 2016 to 2017, he acted as Tavis Brown in the HBO comedy series Vice Principals. In 2017, Henry appeared as Ricky in the NBC drama series This Is Us, for which he received a nomination for the Primetime Emmy Award for Outstanding Guest Actor in a Drama Series. That same year he starred in Dustin Guy Defa's drama film Person to Person and Matt Ruskin's Crown Heights.

In 2018, he returned to Broadway in the revival of Kenneth Lonergan's Lobby Hero opposite Chris Evans, Bel Powley, and Michael Cera. David Rooney of The Hollywood Reporter hailed Henry as "terrific" and cited him as "the production's standout performance". For his performance he was nominated for the Tony Award for Best Featured Actor in a Play. Also in 2018, Henry made his film breakthrough appearing in seven films. He appeared in Steve McQueen's acclaimed heist film Widows portraying Jamal Manning, a crime boss and politician in the Chicago. Alissa Wilkinson of Vox declared "Brian Tyree Henry continues his run as the actor to watch, thanks to his appearance here as a charismatic and menacing political candidate." He also appeared in Barry Jenkins' romantic drama film If Beale Street Could Talk based on the 1974 James Baldwin novel of the same name. For his performances in both films he received a nomination from the National Society of Film Critics Award for Best Supporting Actor. That same year he portrayed Jefferson Davis in the animated superhero film Spider-Man: Into the Spider-Verse which received the Academy Award for Best Animated Feature. That same year he also starred in the  dystopian thriller film Hotel Artemis, and the crime drama White Boy Rick.

In 2019, he appeared in Todd Phillips's psychological drama Joker, the science fiction horror film Don't Let Go and the horror film Child's Play, the latter being a remake of the 1988 film. The following year he appeared in The Outside Story and Superintelligence. During this time he also appeared in the Netflix animated series BoJack Horseman, the HBO anthology series Room 104, and portrayed Berry Gordy an episode of the Comedy Central sketch series Drunk History. He also has recurring roles as Armando in the Fox animated series HouseBroken (2021–present), and as Elijah in the Netflix animated series Big Mouth (2022).

In 2021, he starred as Bernie Hayes in Godzilla vs. Kong alongside Millie Bobby Brown and as Phastos in the Marvel Studios film Eternals directed by Chloe Zhao. In 2022 he starred in David Leitch's action comedy Bullet Train opposite Brad Pitt. In his final role of the year, Henry starred in Lila Neugebauer's A24 drama Causeway opposite Jennifer Lawrence as mechanic James Aucoin. Henry received critical acclaim for his performance, garnering Academy Award, Critics’ Choice, Gotham Award, and Independent Spirit Award nominations. In a review for The Independent, Adam White wrote: “Henry lends each hushed gap in James’s tale the feel of a sledgehammer.”  Mary Siroky for Consequence praised Henry’s performance and said that he “is so grounded here that there are moments we feel like we are intruding into his life."

Personal life
Henry's mother, Willow Deane Kearse, died in early 2016. The Atlanta episode "Woods" was dedicated to her.

Filmography

Film

Television

Theatre

Awards and nominations

References

External links

 

21st-century American male actors
African-American male actors
American male film actors
American male stage actors
American male television actors
American male video game actors
American male voice actors
Living people
Male actors from North Carolina
Morehouse College alumni
Yale School of Drama alumni
People from Fayetteville, North Carolina
1982 births
21st-century African-American people
20th-century African-American people